Mitromorpha keenae is a species of sea snail, a marine gastropod mollusk in the family Mitromorphidae.

Description

Distribution
This marine species occurs off the Galapagos Islands.

References

 Emerson, W.K. & Radwin, G.E. (1969) Two new species of Galapagan turrid gastropods. The Veliger, 12, 149–156, pls. 28–29.

External links
 
 

keenae
Gastropods described in 1969